Smutty Smiff (born 5 July 1959 in East London, England), also known as Stephen Dennis Smith, is a British musician, one of the founding members of rockabilly punk band Levi and the Rockats, discovered by Leee Black Childers, tour manager of David Bowie, Iggy Pop and the Stooges.

Biography
In 1977, Childers had just finished the Anarchy tour with Sex Pistols, the Clash, Siouxsie and the Banshees and Johnny Thunders and the Heartbreakers. After the tour was over, Levi Dexter met Childers at a rockabilly concert in London. Childers decided to start a fresh project. Dexter and Smutty Smiff decided to form a band together, even though Smiff had no musical training. One week later, Childers purchased a double bass for Smiff and a first gig was booked in Max's Kansas City. 

At about same time, when the band was accepted by local artists, musicians and photographers, Smiff became a model and a friend to photographers such as Andy Warhol, Mick Rock, Bob Gruen, Janette Beckman, and Robert Mapplethorpe .  He did some runway shows for Betsey Johnson and Stephen Sprouse. He also did some photo sessions for the German and Italian editions of  Vogue. About his experiences with Warhol and The Factory, Smiff talks in his upcoming book Smutty: The Only Essex Boy In Warhol's Factory. He also released one sold-out book called Kats, Tats, Cars and Creepers as well as co-writing two songs for the John Travolta movie, the General's Daughter 's soundtrack, and appeared in Where the Boys Are.

He toured with The Rockats, opening for Tina Turner, the Clash, David Bowie, Kiss, the Pretenders, Bob Dylan, the Go-Go's, Ramones, Talking Heads, and Joan Jett among others.

In 1979, Dexter decided to quit the band and go solo after a gig at the Whisky a Go Go. Smiff decided at the time to continue with the Rockats with Dibbs Preston as lead singer. After relocating to New York, The Rockats signed with Chris Blackwell and released the album Rockats: Live at the Ritz, with an album cover shot by Mick Rock. Introductions to the album were made by Billy Idol.

Following the release of The Rockats' biggest hit "Make That Move" in 1984, after four months of rehab, Smiff relocated from Arizona to California and formed the Havalinas with Tim Scott McConnell. Their song "High Hopes" was covered by Bruce Springsteen, who in 2014 named his entire album High Hopes.

Smutty Smiff lives in Reykjavík, Iceland, where he works at a homeless shelter and is a radio host in a rock radio station.  He is married to Katrin Rosa Stefansdottir and has two young boys.

Gear
Smutty's fiberglass upright bass, with custom pin striping and his name written across the lower bout, was stolen along with the rest of the Rockats' gear in 1982. In 2021, it was located in a pawn shop in New Jersey. The story of bass was featured in a story in The New York Times. Days after the story of the stolen bass was published, it was returned to Smutty.

References

1959 births
British rockabilly musicians
Living people
Musicians from London